Dejan Ferdinansyah (born 21 January 2000) is an Indonesian badminton player who is affiliated with the Djarum club.

Career 
Ferdinansyah has been affiliated with the PB Djarum club since 2019. In that same year, he partnered with Serena Kani and reached the final of the South Australia International.  In 2020, they lost in the second round of the Thailand Masters. In 2021, they reached the quarter-finals of the 2021 Spain Masters. In December, they competed in the 2021 BWF World Championships. They were the only Indonesians to compete in that edition of the championships after the Indonesian team announced their withdrawal from the championships.

2022 
In 2022, Ferdinansyah formed a new partnership with Gloria Emanuelle Widjaja, who had previously left the national team. In March, they played in All England Open and lost in second round to four seeds and eventual winners Yuta Watanabe and Arisa Higashino of Japan. In the next tour, Swiss Open, they lost in first round. In May, they lost in the second round of Thailand Open from four seeds Wang Yilyu and Huang Dongping of China.

They won their first title as a pair in the Denmark Masters, and then clinched the home soil title in the Yogyakarta Indonesia International Series. They later won their third consecutive title as a pair at the Vietnam Open where they defeat their compatriots Rehan Naufal Kusharjanto and Lisa Ayu Kusumawati in two games. In mid October, they clinched their fourth consecutive title by winning the Malang Indonesia International Challenge tournament. Their winning streak was then stopped by the Chinese pair Jiang Zhenbang and Wei Yaxin in the semi-finals of the Indonesia Masters Super 100, and their ranking shot to the top 50 in the world. In mid November, they reach the semi-finals of the Australian Open. They reached the career-highest ranking of 20 in the final weeks of 2022.

2023 
In January, Ferdinansyah with Widjaja lost in the semi-finals of Malaysia Open from first seed Chinese pair Zheng Siwei and Huang Yaqiong. In the next tournament, they lost in the second round of the India Open from Japanese pair Kyohei Yamashita and Naru Shinoya. They competed in the home tournament, Indonesia Masters, but unfortunately lost in the quarter-finals from Japanese pair Yuki Kaneko and Misaki Matsutomo. They reached the career-highest ranking of 15 in the final weeks of January 2023. In the next tournament, they lost in the quarter-finals of the Thailand Masters from 6th seed Chinese pair Feng Yanzhe and Olympic champion Huang Dongping.

In March, they competed in the European tour, but unfortunately lost in the second round of German Open from Hong Kong pair Lee Chun Hei and Ng Tsz Yau.

Achievements

BWF World Tour (1 title) 
The BWF World Tour, which was announced on 19 March 2017 and implemented in 2018, is a series of elite badminton tournaments sanctioned by the Badminton World Federation (BWF). The BWF World Tour is divided into levels of World Tour Finals, Super 1000, Super 750, Super 500, Super 300, and the BWF Tour Super 100.

Mixed doubles

BWF International Challenge/Series (3 titles, 1 runner-up) 
Mixed doubles

  BWF International Challenge tournament
  BWF International Series tournament

Performance timeline

Individual competitions

Senior level

Men's doubles

Mixed doubles

References

External links 
 

2000 births
Living people
People from Garut
Sportspeople from West Java
Indonesian male badminton players
21st-century Indonesian people